Salim Chaf (also Romanized as Salīm Chāf; also known as Salīm Chāk) is a village in Dehgah Rural District, Kiashahr District, Astaneh-ye Ashrafiyeh County, Gilan Province, Iran. At the 2006 census, its population was 360, in 109 families.

References 

Populated places in Astaneh-ye Ashrafiyeh County